Blessed John Henry Newman RC College is a coeducational Roman Catholic secondary school located in Chadderton in the Metropolitan Borough of Oldham, Greater Manchester, England under the Roman Catholic Diocese of Salford.

The school was formed in 2011 from the amalgamation of St Augustine of Canterbury RC High School in Werneth, Oldham and Our Lady's R.C. High School in Royton. The merged school was originally based over the two former school sites, but has now moved to a new building.

In the Ofsted inspection of February 2013 the school was judged as inadequate. In the inspection of May 2015 it was rated as 'good'.

References

External links

Catholic secondary schools in the Diocese of Salford
Secondary schools in the Metropolitan Borough of Oldham
Educational institutions established in 2011
2011 establishments in England
Voluntary aided schools in England
Chadderton